Sakasaka is a community in Tamale Metropolitan District in the Northern Region of Ghana.
It is the home ground of the Sakasaka Football Club.

See also
Jisonaayili

References 

Communities in Ghana
Suburbs of Tamale, Ghana